Vedantam Raghavayya (8 June 1919 – 1971) was an Indian film director, dance choreographer, Kuchipudi exponent, actor, producer, and musician known for his works in Telugu cinema, Telugu theatre, and Tamil cinema. Raghavayya was an accomplished Kuchipudi dancer, who was awarded "Bharata Kala Prapurna" in dance by the Andhra Pradesh government.

Starting his career as a dance choregrapher, Raghavayya choreographed for films such as Raithu Bidda (1939), and Swarga Seema (1945). He made his directorial and production debut with Stree Sahasamu (1951). He then directed successful films such as Devadasu (1953), Annadata (1954), Anarkali (1955), Chiranjeevulu (1956), Bhale Ramudu (1956), Prema Pasam (Tamil, 1956), Suvarna Sundari (1957), Rahasyam (1967). As an actor he starred in Mohini Rukmanigada (1937), Garuda Garvabhangam (1943) and Raksharekha (1949). He was the co-owner of the film production house "Vinodha Pictures".

Raghavayya served in the committee of the First General Council of the "Andhra Pradesh Sangeetha Nataka Academy" that represented Dance and was also nominated in 1964 as the President of the "National Dance Festival". Noted dancer, Bhagavathula Yagna Narayana Sarma, Sangeet Natak Akademi winner was trained under Raghavayya's Fellowship.

Film craft and Devadasu
His directorial film Devadasu (1953), which was the first Telugu adaptation of Sarat Chandra Chattopadhyay's novel, and Devadas was the second Tamil adaptation of the same, following the 1937 Devadas directed by and starring P. V. Rao. During pre-production Akkineni Nageswara Rao, who portrayed the titular character, later recalled that Raghavayya, being a Kuchipudi dance exponent and an experienced stage actor, used to enact the scenes before the actors, thereby making their job easy. He recalled that the director shot him only at night so that he could give the character a "drunken, droopy" look. Those night-time shots were filmed over 50 days. Devadasu and Devadas are regarded as among the most successful films in Telugu and Tamil cinema respectively. Both versions were critically and commercially successful. It has since achieved cult status, with terms and phrases from the film being widely cited. In April 2013, News18 included the film in its list of "100 greatest Indian films of all time".

Theater and dance
Usha in Ushaparinayam
Sita in Ramanataka Yakshaganam
Leelavathi in Prahallada Yakshaganam
Chandramathi in Hrischandra nataka Yakshaganam
Sasirekha in Sasirekhaparinaya Yakshaganam
Mohini in Mohini Rukmangada Yakshaganam
Satyabhama in Bhamakalapa Yakshaganam
Bala Gopala Tarangam

Personal life
Raghavayya was born in Kuchipudi, Krishna district of Andhra Pradesh on 8 June 1919 to Vedantam Ramayya and Annapurnamma. He had six daughters and a son, including renowned Kuchipudi guru Vedantam Ramu, and actress Shubha. He was married to actress Suryaprabha, the sister of actress Pushpavalli who was partner to Gemini Ganesan, and their daughter Rekha is a Hindi actress.

Selected filmography
As actor and choreographer
Mohini Rukmanigada (1937) (actor in the Balagopala Tarangam)
Raithu Bidda (1939) (dancer and choreographer)
Panthulamma (1943) (choreographer)
Garuda Garvabhangam (1943) (actor and choreographer)
Sri Seeta Rama Jananam (1944) (choreographer)
Swargaseema (1945) (choreographer)
Tyagayya (1946) (choreographer)
Palnati Yudham (1947) (choreographer)
Yogi Vemana (1947) (choreographer)
Vande Mataram (1948) (choreographer)
Laila Majnu (1949) (choreographer)
Raksharekha (1949) (actor and choreographer)

As director
Stree Sahasamu (1951) (producer and director)
Santhi (1952) (producer and director)
Devadasu (Telugu and Tamil) (1953) (producer and director)
Annadata (1954) (director)
Anarkali (1955) (director)
Chiranjeevulu (1956) (director)
Bhale Ramudu (Telugu, 1956) (director)
Prema Pasam (Tamil, 1956) (director)
Suvarna Sundari (1957) (screenplay writer and director)
Bhale Ammayilu (Telugu, 1957) (director)
Iru Sagodarigal (Tamil, 1957) (director)
Manalane Mangayin Bhagyam (1957) (director)
Raja Nandini (1958) (director)
Inti Guttu (1958) (director)
Bala Nagamma (1959) (director)
Jai Bhawana (1959) (director)
Adutha Veetu Penn (1960) (director)
Mamaku Tagga Alludu (1960) (director)
Runanubandham (1960) (director)
Swarna Manjari (1962) (director)
Mangaiyar Ullam Mangatha Selvam (1962) (director)
Aada Brathuku (1965) (director)
Nanna Kartavya (1965) (director)
Badukuva Daari (1966) (director)
Sati Sakkubai (1965) (director)
Rahasyam (1967) (director)
Sati Sumathi (1967) (director)
Kumkumabharina (1968) (director)
Sapta Swaralu (1969) (director)
Ulagam Ivvalavuthan (1969) (director)
Bhale Ethu Chivaraku Chittu (1970) (director)

References

External links
 

Telugu film directors
Film producers from Andhra Pradesh
1971 deaths
Indian film choreographers
1919 births
Kuchipudi exponents
Indian male film actors
People from Krishna district
Indian choreographers
Telugu film producers
Indian classical choreographers
Dancers from Andhra Pradesh
20th-century Indian dancers
20th-century Indian educators
20th-century Indian film directors
Male actors from Andhra Pradesh
Teachers of Indian classical dance
Performers of Indian classical dance
Film directors from Andhra Pradesh
20th-century Indian male actors